Matteo Donati and Andrey Golubev were the defending champions but only Golubev chose to defend his title, partnering Uladzimir Ignatik. Golubev lost in the first round to Marinko Matosevic and Bradley Mousley.

Hans Podlipnik and Max Schnur won the title after defeating Steven de Waard and Marc Polmans 7–6(7–5), 4–6, [10–6] in the final.

Seeds

Draw

References
 Main Draw

City of Onkaparinga ATP Challenger - Doubles